This is a list of Paralympians who have represented New Zealand at all Summer and Winter Paralympic Games since the nation's debut at the 1968 Summer Paralympics. Athletes are listed according to their official Paralympic number, with a total of 228 as of the 2022 Winter Paralympics. This number is bestowed once a Paralympian has competed at their first Paralympic Games.

List 

Source:

See also 
 New Zealand at the Paralympics

Notes

References 

New Zealand at the Paralympics